Artolsheim is a commune in the Bas-Rhin department in Alsace in northeastern France.

Geography
Artolsheim has the distinction of being further from the sea than any other place in France.

Population

Economy
Employment opportunities in the village are limited.   The traditional economic focus of the region is Sélestat some fifteen kilometres (ten miles) to the west.   The river crossing of Marckolsheim with its associated locks and hydro-electric power station offer employment opportunities: many mostly low-paid seasonal jobs are also provided by the Europa-Park 'theme park'.

See also
Communes of the Bas-Rhin department

References

Communes of Bas-Rhin